Amr Aboul Kheir is an Egyptian basketball coach for the Egyptian national team, which participated at the 2014 FIBA Basketball World Cup.

References

Living people
Egyptian basketball coaches
Year of birth missing (living people)
Place of birth missing (living people)
21st-century Egyptian people